The Naperville Fire Department (NFD) provides fire suppression and emergency medical services to the city of Naperville, Illinois, the fourth largest city in the state and third largest city outside of Chicago. The department is responsible for an area of  consisting of 149,540 residents as of the 2020 census. The Majority of sworn personnel are cross trained as Firefighters and Paramedics. The Department was founded and chartered by the city of Naperville and State of Illinois in 1874 after two major fires occurred in the downtown area. In 1883, Naperville’s first station was constructed on West Jefferson Street downtown. The main station remained downtown until 1992, when the Fire Administration Building was constructed at the Public Safety complex on Aurora Avenue.

Stations & Apparatus 
The NFD has a total of 10 fire stations spread around the city.

* Staffed from 8:30a-5:00p with power shifting personnel

References

Fire departments in Illinois
Organizations based in Naperville, Illinois
Government agencies established in 1874
1874 establishments in Illinois